Calvin Hunt (1957 – December 26, 2009) was an American Christian singer.

Background 

When Hunt's group fell through he continued writing and singing for friends and family, doing block parties, etc. Hunt later became addicted to crack cocaine. Eventually, with the prayer of his wife and children and his Church, The Brooklyn Tabernacle, Hunt rehabilitated and became a full-time minister. Hunt sang with the Brooklyn Tabernacle Choir and the Brooklyn Tabernacle Singers, with whom he won a Grammy and a Dove Award.

Hunt Recorded 4 of 5 Albums 1 unreleased. 
Released Albums years 1998 – 2007. 

Hunt was also diagnosed with lung cancer but he continued to perform. His 2008 album, Bridges, was nominated for a Dove Award for Contemporary Gospel Album of the Year, with the song "Come On" being nominated for Contemporary Gospel Recorded Song of the Year.

Hunt had been battling cancer and died from cardiac arrest on December 26, 2009, in Jamaica Hospital in Queens, New York.

Discography 
Calvin Hunt Story :When You Just Can't Stop

 Not I But Christ (1998)
 Mercy Saw Me (2001)
 Power in the Name of the Lord (2001)
 Bridges (2007)

References

External links
Calvin Hunt on AllMusic

1957 births
2009 deaths
American performers of Christian music
American gospel singers
20th-century American singers
People from Queens, New York
Singers from New York City